Harenfema is a district of Oromia Region in Ethiopia.

See also 

 Districts of Ethiopia

References 

Districts of Oromia Region